The 2006 Duramed Futures Tour was a series of professional women's golf tournaments held from March through September 2006 in the United States. The Futures Tour is the second-tier women's professional golf tour in the United States and is the "official developmental tour" of the LPGA Tour.  

The age minimum age for participation was lowered to 17 for the 2006 season.

Schedule and results
The number in parentheses after winners' names shows the player's total number of official money, individual event wins on the Futures Tour including that event.

Tournaments in bold are majors.

Leading money winners
These top five money winners at the end of the 2006 season were awarded fully exempt status on the LPGA Tour for the 2007 season.

Major tournament
In 2006, the Futures Tour held its first major tournament. The Michelob Ultra Futures Players Championship in Decatur, Illinois, which has been on the Tour's schedule since 1985, was the Tour's first 72-hole event, and carried the Tour's largest purse ever — $100,000. The winner, Salimah Mussani, received a sponsor's exemption to play in the LPGA's State Farm Classic  in September, 2006. Mussani, a native of Canada, also played in the CN Canadian Women's Open, an August 2006 event on the LPGA Tour.

2006 traffic death
On June 18, 2006, while driving from a tournament in Decatur, Illinois to the next tournament in Lima, Ohio, Futures Tour player Gaelle Truet was killed in a car accident at age 27. She was the first Tour player to perish in a traffic incident in the 26 years of the Futures Tour and the 50 years of the LPGA Tour.

References

External links
Official site

Symetra Tour
Futures Tour